(-)-Versicolamide B and  (+)-Versicolamide B are spiroindole alkaloids isolated from the fungus Aspergillus that belong to a class of naturally occurring 2,5-diketopiperazines.  The versicolamides are structurally complex spiro-cyclized versions of prenylated cyclo(L-Trp-L-Pro) derivatives which possess a unique spiro-fusion to a pyrrolidine at the 3-position of the oxindole core together with the bicyclo[2.2.2]diazaoctane ring system. While (-)-versicolamide B was isolated from the marine fungus Aspergillus sp.  the enantiomer (+)-versicolamide B was isolated from the terrestrial fungi Aspergillus versicolor NRRL.
The total asymmetric syntheses of both enantiomers have been achieved and the implications of their biosynthesis have been investigated.

References

Alkaloids
Diketopiperazines